Xiangfu Wan  is a dark yellow to dark brown pill used in Traditional Chinese medicine to "regulate the flow of qi and nourish blood". It is aromatic and tastes pungent, slightly sweet and slightly bitter. It is used when there is "stagnation of qi and deficiency of blood, marked by sensations of stuffiness in the chest, costal pain, abdominal pain during menstrual periods and menstrual disorders".   The binding agent of the pill is honey.

Chinese classic herbal formula

See also
 Chinese classic herbal formula
 Bu Zhong Yi Qi Wan

References

Traditional Chinese medicine pills